The Westminster Presbyterian Church in Topeka, Kansas was built during 1924 to 1926.  It was designed by architect Charles Cuthbert in Late Gothic Revival architecture.  It was listed on the National Register of Historic Places in 2004.

Its NRHP nomination describes: "As with most Late Gothic Revival structures, Westminster's design is quieter, smoother, less ornate and "top heavy" than that of the high Victorian Gothic period. There is little tracery and ornamentation is kept to a minimum."

References

External links
Official website

Presbyterian churches in Kansas
Churches on the National Register of Historic Places in Kansas
Gothic Revival church buildings in Kansas
Churches completed in 1926
Churches in Topeka, Kansas
National Register of Historic Places in Topeka, Kansas